Ardabil (or Ardebīl) is a city in northwestern Iran, and the capital of Ardabil Province. At the time of the National Census of 2006, the population of the city was 412,669 in 32,386 households. The following census in 2011 counted 482,632 people in 134,715 households. By the time of the census of 2016, there were 529,374 inhabitants living in 158,627 households. As of the 2022 census, Ardabil's population was 588,000. The population of Ardabil is about 650,000 with the majority Shia Muslim. The dominant majority in the city are ethnic Iranian Azerbaijanis and the primary language of the people is Azerbaijani.

Ardabil is known for its trade in silk and carpets. Ardabil rugs are renowned and the ancient Ardabil carpets are considered among the best of classical Persian carpets. Ardabil is also home to a World Heritage Site, the Ardabil Shrine, the sanctuary and tomb of Shaikh Safî ad-Dîn, eponymous founder of the Safavid dynasty.

Etymology 
The name Ardabil comes from the Avestan artavil or artawila which means "holy place".

Location 
Neighboring on the Caspian Sea and the Republic of Azerbaijan, it has been of great political and economic significance throughout history, especially within the Caucasus region.

History

The pre-Islamic history of Ardabil is vague. Muslim historians attribute the foundation of Ardabil to the Sasanian King of Kings Peroz I, who named it Shad Peroz or Shahram Peroz. The city may have corresponded to the Sasanian mint city known in Middle Persian as ATRA, albeit this remains uncertain. During the Arab conquest of Iran, Ardabil was the seat of a marzban (margrave), who agreed to surrender to the Arabs in return for permitting the people of Ardabil to continue their religious observances at the fire temple of Shiz (present-day Takht-e Solayman). 

Due to being near the Caucasus, Ardabil was always susceptible to attacks by the Caucasian hill peoples as well as by the inhabitants of the steppes of Northern Caucasus. In 730–731, the Khazars passed through the Alan Gates, and defeated and killed the Arab governor of Armenia, al-Jarrah ibn Abdallah. The clash took place on the plain outside the town of Ardabil, which was subsequently captured by the Khazars, who made incursions as far as Diyar Bakr and al-Jazira before they were repelled by the Umayyad prince Maslama ibn Abd al-Malik (d. 738). According to the Arab geographer al-Maqdisi (d. 991), "seventy languages" were spoken around Ardabil, which most likely refers to various variations of the Adhari language.

In 1209, a reinvigorated Georgia had its forces plunder Ardabil, reportedly killing 12,000 residents. Ardabil later withstood two attacks by the Mongols, but was ultimately sacked by them in 1220. The city managed to recuperate and reached a more blossoming state than before, though by this time Tabriz was the leading city in the Azerbaijan region, and under the later Ilkhanate, it had become Soltaniyeh.

Safavid king Ismail I, born in Ardabil, started his campaign to nationalize Iran's government and land from there, but consequently announced Tabriz as his capital in 1501. Yet Ardabil remained an important city both politically and economically until modern times. During the frequent Ottoman-Persian Wars, being close to the borders, it was often sacked by the Ottomans between 1514 and 1722 as well as in 1915 during World War I when the former invaded neighboring Iran.

In the early Qajar period, crown prince Abbas Mirza, son of then incumbent king (shah) Fath Ali Shah Qajar (r. 1797–1834) was the governor of Ardabil. With Ardabil already once being sacked by the Russians during the Russo-Persian War of 1804–1813, and this being the era of the Russians steadily advancing into the Iranian possessions in the Caucasus, Abbas Mirza ordered the Napoleonic general Gardane, who served the Qajars at the time, to strengthen and fortify the town with ramparts. During the next and final war, the Russo-Persian War of 1826–28, the ramparts were stormed by the Russian troops, who then temporarily occupied the town. The town's extensive and noted library, known as the library of Safi-ad-din Ardabili, was taken to St. Petersburg by General Ivan Paskevich with the promise that its holdings would be brought to the Russian capital for safekeeping until they could be returned, a promise never fulfilled.

After the Russo-Persian Wars, Iran ceded its territories in the Caucasus to Russia under the terms of the Treaty of Turkmenchay (1828). As a result, Ardabil was situated only 40 kilometers from the newly drawn border, becoming even more important economically as a stop on a major caravan route along which European goods entered Iran from Russia. After he visited Ardabil in 1872, German diplomat Max von Thielmann noted, in his book published in 1875, the extensive activity in the town's bazaar, as well as the presence of many foreigners, and estimated its population at 20,000. During the early Iranian Constitutional Revolution, Russia occupied Ardabil together with the rest of Iranian Azerbaijan until the eventual collapse of the Russian Empire in 1917.

Bazaars

In the heart of the city, stands the ancient bazaar, described by historians of the 4th century CE as cruciform, with simply designed domes extending in four directions. Most sections of the bazaar were constructed and renovated during the Safavid and Zand periods.

Produce Bazar, Ardabil and vicinity

Located at the Meshkin Shahr gate is a market where farmers directly sell their produce to the public.

Shrine

One of the main sights in the city of Ardabil in north-west Iran is the shrine of Shaykh Safi al-Din Ardabili, who died in 1334. The Shaykh was a Sufi leader, who trained his followers in Islamic mystic practices. After his death, his followers remained loyal to his family, who became increasingly powerful.

In 1501, one of his descendants, Shah Isma'il, seized political power. He united Iran for the first time in several centuries and established the Shi'i form of Islam as the state religion. Isma'il was the founder of the Safavid dynasty, named after Shaykh Safi al-Din.

The Safavids, who ruled without a break until 1722, and then intermittently until 1757, promoted the shrine of the Shaykh as a place of pilgrimage.

Ardabil carpet

In the late 1530s, Isma'il's son, Shah Tahmasp, enlarged the shrine, and it was at this time, that the carpet was made as one of a matching pair. The completion of the carpets was marked by a four-line inscription placed at one end. The first two lines are a poetic quotation that refers to the shrine as a place of refuge:

'Except for thy threshold, there is no refuge for me in all the world.
Except for this door there is no resting-place for my head.'

The third line is a signature, 'The work of the slave of the portal, Maqsud Kashani.' Maqsud was probably the court official charged with producing the carpets. He was not necessarily a slave in the literal sense but called himself one to express humility, while the word for 'portal' can be used for a royal court or a shrine. Perhaps Maqsud meant both, as in this case the court was the patron of the shrine.

The fourth line contains the date 946 in the Muslim calendar, which is equivalent to 1539–1540 CE.

The Ardabil Carpet and the V&A

The two Ardabil carpets were still in the shrine of Shaykh Safi al-Din in 1843, when one was seen by two British visitors. Thirty years or more later, the shrine suffered an earthquake, and the carpets were sold off, perhaps to raise funds for repairs. The damaged carpets were purchased in Iran by Ziegler & Co., a Manchester firm involved in the carpet trade. Parts of one carpet were used to patch the other. The result was one 'complete' carpet and one with no border.

In 1892, the larger carpet was put on sale by Vincent Robinson & Co. of London. The designer William Morris went to inspect it on behalf of this museum. Reporting that the carpet was 'of singular perfection ... logically and consistently beautiful', he urged the museum to buy it. The money was raised, and in March 1893 the Museum acquired the carpet for £2000.

The second, smaller carpet was sold secretly to an American collector, and in 1953 it was given to the Los Angeles County Museum of Art. The Ardabil carpet hung on the wall in this gallery for many years. In 2006, the museum created the case in the centre of the gallery so that the carpet could be seen as intended, on the floor. To preserve its colours, it is lit for ten minutes on the hour and half-hour.

Earthquakes
Ardabil is associated with historical confusion between the 893 Dvin earthquake which was often wrongly documented as the 893 Ardabil earthquake due to the similarity of the Arabic name for city of Dvin in Armenia, 'Dabil' to Ardabil.

On 28 February 1997, a destructive earthquake hit the Ardabil area.  At least 965 people were killed, 2,600 injured, 36,000 homeless, 12,000 houses damaged or destroyed and 160,000 livestock were killed. Severe damage was observed to roads, electrical power lines, communications and water distribution systems around Ardabil.

Climate 
Ardebil has a cold semi-arid climate (Köppen: BSk), bordering a humid continental climate (Köppen: Dfb, Trewartha: Dc), with cool, relatively dry summers and freezing, relatively wet winters.
many tourists come to the region for its cool climate during the hot summer months.

Attractions 

In addition to these, in many villages of Ardabil, relics of ancient monuments, including tombs have been found.

Being a city of great antiquity, the origins of Ardabil go back 4,000 to 6,000 years (according to historical research in this city). This city was the capital of Azerbaijan province in different times, but its golden age was in the Safavid period.

Geology

The hot springs and natural landscapes in the Ardabil area attract tourists. The mineral springs of Ardabil (Beele-Darreh, Sar'eyn, Sardabeh and Booshloo) are notable throughout Iran for their medicinal qualities.

Of the many lakes in the area, the largest include Ne'or, Shorabil, ShoorGel, NouShahr and Aloocheh that are the habitats of some species of water birds. The Lake Ne'or is located in a mountainous area 48 km south-east of the city of Ardabil. It covers an area of 2.1 km2 and has an average depth of 3 metres. It is fed by springs in the lake bed.

Colleges and universities
 Mohaghegh Ardabili University With Architecture and Mechanical Engineering as the most popular department
 Ardabil University of Medical Sciences
 Islamic Azad University of Ardabil
 Payam Noor University of Ardabil
 Soureh University of Ardabil
 University of Applied Science of Ardabil
 Islamic Azad University of Khalkhal

Economy

The economy of Ardabil is partially agricultural, partially tourist-based, with some industries in operation.

The Iranian government in 2006 announced plans to build "the largest textile factory of its kind in the Middle East" in Ardabil.

Arta Industrial Group (AIG) has one of the largest textile conglomerates in Iran, which is located in the provinces called Qazvin and Ardabil. The group has received numerous awards for being one of the top 20 exporters and industrial groups in Iran since 1998. It is the first company to produce high-density fiberboard (HDF), medium-density fiberboard (MDF), laminate flooring and multi-layer films in Iran.

AIG has the first private industrial site in Iran in the city of Ardabil, which has fifteen main factories owned by (AIG). This Industrial zone covers an area of 100 hectares and Residential Area for engineers and managers of the company.

The city is served by Refah Chain Stores Co., Iran Hyper Star, Isfahan City Center, Shahrvand Chain Stores Inc., Ofoq Kourosh chain store.

The town has an airport.

Sports

Football
Ardabil is host to several football teams. The most popular team in Ardabil is Shahrdari Ardabil, promoted in 2014 to the Azadegan League, the second tier of Iranian football. The city is renowned for producing great forwards, namely former Bayern Munich player and record international goal scorer Ali Daei.

Volleyball
Some International Volleyball Competitions was held in Ardabil: 2017 Asian Men's U23 Volleyball Championship, 2018 FIVB Volleyball Men's World Championship AVC qualification and 2019 FIVB Volleyball Men's Nations League (preliminary round).

Notable people
For a complete list see: :Category:People from Ardabil

Twin towns and sister cities 
  Tiszavasvári, Hungary (since 2011)
  Volgograd, Russia (since 2015)

Photo gallery

See also 

 Sabalan TV
 Ardabil Khanate

Further reading
 Yves Bomati and Houchang Nahavandi,Shah Abbas, Emperor of Persia, 1587–1629, 2017, ed. Ketab Corporation, Los Angeles, English translation by Azizeh Azodi.

References

Sources
 
 
 

 
Ardabil County
Cities in Ardabil Province
Iranian provincial capitals
Populated places along the Silk Road
Populated places established in the 4th century BC
Sasanian cities
Peroz I